Cerro de Navas is a town in the Puerto Plata province of the Dominican Republic.

Sources 
World Gazeteer: Dominican Republic – World-Gazetteer.com

Populated places in Puerto Plata Province